The discography of Saint Vitus consists of nine studio albums, three live albums, two EPs, one compilation album, one live DVD, three singles and four self-released demos (two of which were recorded under its original name Tyrant).

Studio albums

Live albums

Compilation albums

Extended plays

Singles

Video albums

Demo albums

References

Heavy metal group discographies
Discographies of American artists